Splendrillia subtilis is a species of sea snails, a marine gastropod mollusc in the family Drilliidae.

Description
The length of the shell attains 9.1 mm.

Distribution
This marine species occurs in the Caribbean Sea off Colombia.

References

 Fallon P.J. (2016). Taxonomic review of tropical western Atlantic shallow water Drilliidae (Mollusca: Gastropoda: Conoidea) including descriptions of 100 new species. Zootaxa. 4090(1): 1–363

External links
 

subtilis
Gastropods described in 2016